Macrophthalmus boteltobagoe is a species of crab in the family Macrophthalmidae. It was described by Sakai in 1939.

References

Ocypodoidea
Crustaceans described in 1939